So You Think You Can Dance is a New Zealand televised dance competition based on the format of the American show by the same name and other series in the international So You Think You Can Dance television franchise. Aired by New Zealand television network TV3 and hosted by New Zealand television personality Shane Cortese, the show broadcast a single season in 2006.

References

New Zealand
New Zealand reality television series
2000s New Zealand television series
2006 New Zealand television series debuts
2006 New Zealand television series endings
New Zealand television series based on American television series
Three (TV channel) original programming
Dance competition television shows